Cheryl Mary Clare Hurst is an Antiguan and Barbudan politician. She is a senator of the Upper House of Parliament in Antigua and Barbuda. She was appointed senator by Prime Minister Gaston Browne. She is also the General Secretary of the Antigua and Barbuda Labour Party. Hurst was appointed senator after the 2014 general elections held in Antigua and Barbuda.

In 2018, she was appointed senator after the 2018 general elections of Antigua and Barbuda. She retained this seat in 2023.

References

See also 

 Senate (Antigua and Barbuda)

Living people
Antigua and Barbuda politicians
Antigua and Barbuda Labour Party politicians
Members of the Senate (Antigua and Barbuda)
Year of birth missing (living people)